The World Kendo Championship is an international kendo competition contested by the member nations of the International Kendo Federation (FIK). The championships have been conducted every three years since their inception in 1970. The host of the tournament usually rotates in order through the three FIK administrative regions of Asia, the Americas and Europe.

The competition is divided into four divisions: Men's Individual, Women's Individual, Men's Team, Women's Team. Team matches are individual between five members from each team which change sequentially at the end of each round.

There is an opinion in Japan that this tournament is not of the same caliber as the All Japan Kendo Championship or the All Japan Police Kendo Championship. The argument being that there is a distinct qualitative difference in the playing level and style of nationalities where Japanese people lived or immigrated to before WW2, and countries that began practicing Kendo post-war. Another opinion is that the level of non-Japanese referees is not of high enough caliber for matches to be judged fairly. In order to offset this, mandatory international referee seminars are organized by the International Kendo Federation with high-ranking Japanese Kendo officials as lecturers.

Until 2006, Japan had never lost a championship in any of the four divisions, when the Men's Team suffered a narrow loss against USA in the semi-final, with South Korea claiming victory in the final. This was Japan's first official defeat despite other teams coming close, such as South Korea and Canada in 1997 and 2000 respectively. In the individual division, more and more South Koreans are appearing in the semi-finals and final.

On 4 September 2020, FIK postponed the 18th championships (18WKC), originally scheduled for May 2021, to a later date, due to the COVID-19 pandemic. It was then cancelled on 20 February 2021

The next edition of World Kendo Championships (19WKC) will be held in Milan, Italy in 2024.

Men's

Team
The following is a summary of medals acquired by country for the Men's Team Division.

Individual

Women's

Team
The following is a summary of medals acquired by country for the Women's Team Division. (5-person team)

Individual

Hosts
The following is a list of the host countries of the World Kendo Championships.

See also

European Kendo Championships European Kendo Championships

References

External links

Kendo
Kendo